Julian Michel (born 19 February 1992) is a French footballer of Moroccan descent who currently plays for the reserve team of Lokeren.

Club career 
Michel joined Royal Mouscron-Péruwelz in 2013 from Lille OSC B. In 2014, the club promoted to the Belgian Pro League. He made his top division debut at 27 July 2014 against R.S.C. Anderlecht in a 3–1 away defeat.

On 31 January 2019 it was announced, that Michel, Mario Tičinović and Djordje Jovanovic had been promoted to reserve team due to a lack of commitment. The club was in a very bad position, which with 7 matches to go was very close to relegation.

References

External links

1992 births
Living people
People from Échirolles
French footballers
French sportspeople of Moroccan descent
Louhans-Cuiseaux FC players
Royal Excel Mouscron players
S.K. Beveren players
K.S.C. Lokeren Oost-Vlaanderen players
Belgian Pro League players
French expatriate footballers
Expatriate footballers in Belgium
Association football forwards
Sportspeople from Isère
Footballers from Auvergne-Rhône-Alpes